Godfrey Cyril Stevens (born 24 June 1986) was a South African cricketer. A left-handed batsman and left-arm orthodox spin bowler, he played first-class cricket for Boland from the 2005/06 season.

References
Godfrey Stevens profile at CricketArchive

1986 births
Living people
South African cricketers
Boland cricketers